The Italy women's national tennis team represents Italy in international women's tennis and is directed by the Federazione Italiana Tennis. The team played in the first ever tournament in 1963, and is one of four teams that has taken part in every single edition since.

The Italian national team was initially unsuccessful in world tennis, only winning twenty ties in the first two decades of competition never reaching past the quarterfinals since 1999, but in recent times they have become of the most successful teams in the world. They have been a regular member of the ITF rankings World Top Ten since the initiation of the rankings in 2002, and became one of five teams to reach the World No. 1 position in 2009, after they managed to reach all but one final from 2006 to 2010. They have also reached every semifinal since 2009, and since 2001, have accumulated a 22–9 win–loss ratio. Francesca Schiavone holds the Italian Fed Cup record for most singles wins and total wins, while Roberta Vinci holds the record for most doubles wins and years of participation. Sandra Cecchini has participated in the most ties for Italy, however, having played in just two more ties Schiavone and Vinci.

Former ATP World No. 7 and Davis Cup captain Corrado Barazzutti is the current captain of the Italian Fed Cup team, having held that position since 2002. As of April 2013, the team is the World No. 2 in the ITF rankings, with only Czech Republic holding a higher position.

Current team

History
Italy competed in its first Fed Cup in 1963, the team consisting of Lea Pericoli and Silvana Lazzarino.  They are one of four nations to have competed in every edition of the tournament.  Italy won the Cup in 2006, 2009, 2010 and 2013.

Results

1963-1979

1980-1994

1995-2014

Records

Longest winning streak

Finals: 5 (4 titles, 1 runner-up)

Notes

References

External links
 

Billie Jean King Cup teams
Fed Cup
Tennis